José Alirio Carrasco (born 22 February 1976) is a Colombian long-distance runner. He competed in the men's marathon at the 2000 Summer Olympics and the 2004 Summer Olympics.

References

External links
 

1976 births
Living people
Athletes (track and field) at the 2000 Summer Olympics
Athletes (track and field) at the 2004 Summer Olympics
Colombian male long-distance runners
Colombian male marathon runners
Olympic athletes of Colombia
Place of birth missing (living people)
21st-century Colombian people